Jeremy "Mush One" Mushlin is a trumpeter, composer, engineer, producer, sound system operator, and radio host who has played in reggae, ska, calypso and rocksteady bands, including The Slackers, The Scorchers, Fireproof, The Hungry March Band, Top Shotta Band, Red Hook Warriorz, and The Rocksteady Seven.

Discography

With The Slackers
 Redlight (1997)
 The Question (1998)
 Live At Ernesto's (2000)
 Wasted Days (2001)

With The Scorchers
 Stuntin' (2005)

With The Rocksteady Seven
 Playtime (1999)

With Hungry March Band
Running Through With the Sadness (2018)
Portable Soundtracks for Temporary Utopias (2007)
Critical Brass (2005)
On the Waterfront (2002)

With Top Shotta Band
Top Shotta Band featuring Screechy Dan (2014)

With Sister Nancy
Sister Nancy Meets Fireproof (2001)

With Lady Ann
Bad Gyal Inna Dance (2008)

References

American reggae musicians
Living people
20th-century births
Year of birth missing (living people)
American trumpeters
The Slackers members